The Howling Wolf (German: Der heulende Wolf) is a 1919 German silent crime film directed by Léo Lasko and starring Carl Auen, Meinhart Maur and Victor Janson. It was part of a series of films featuring the detective character Joe Deebs.

It was shot at the Templehof Studios in Berlin. The film's sets were designed by the art director Kurt Richter.

Cast
 Carl Auen  as Joe Deebs, Detektiv 
 Meinhart Maur
 Victor Janson
 Albert Patry

References

Bibliography
Ken Wlaschin. Silent Mystery and Detective Movies: A Comprehensive Filmography. McFarland, 2009.
 Hans-Michael Bock & Michael Töteberg. Das Ufa-Buch. Zweitausendeins, 1992.

External links
 

1919 films
Films of the Weimar Republic
German silent feature films
Films directed by Léo Lasko
UFA GmbH films
German black-and-white films
German crime films
1919 crime films
Films shot at Tempelhof Studios
1910s German films
1910s German-language films